No Man's Land is the seventh album by French rock singer Jacques Higelin, released in April 1978. The song "Pars" was covered by Grace Jones on her Warm Leatherette album in 1980.

Recording
Higelin was reportedly dissatisfied with the record, and wanted to destroy the tapes to avoid releasing it, but was persuaded otherwise by his friends, musicians Laurent Thibaut and Francis Moze. Higelin came later to appreciate it somewhat.

Track listing

Charts and certifications

Charts

Certification

Personnel

Musicians
 Jacques Higelin: vocals, keyboards, Korg, pianos, accordion, bass guitar
 Pierre Chérèze: guitars
 Dan Ar Braz: guitars
 Jacky Thomas: bass guitar
 Serge Perathoner: keyboards
 Jean Cirillo: drums
 Michel Santangeli: drums
 Christian Leroux: guitar
 Les petits chanteurs de l'école de Bondy: background vocals

Production
 Laurent Thibault, Christophe Bonno, Michel Marie: recording
 Christian Orsini, studio Translab: mastering
 Dominique Mallegni: photographs
 Bruno Ducourant: design

References 

1978 albums
Jacques Higelin albums
Pathé-Marconi albums
EMI Records albums